The Paul Simon Songbook is the debut solo studio album by Paul Simon. It was released in the UK in 1965. It was made available in the US as part of the LP box set Paul Simon: Collected Works (1981). The album was produced by Reginald Warburton and Stanley West as Columbia/CBS Records LP BPG 62579 in the UK; remastered CD Columbia/Legacy/SME CK 90281.

Background
The Paul Simon Songbook was recorded in London. Simon made several trips to England in 1964 and '65,  performing in small clubs and theaters. During 1965 he played in Paris, Haarlem, and Copenhagen, along with London and other locations in the UK. In 1964, Simon and Art Garfunkel had released the folk-inspired album Wednesday Morning, 3 A.M. in the US. While Simon was touring and appearing on radio shows in England in 1965 (sometimes with Garfunkel), he began to receive attention from fans. At the time Wednesday Morning, 3 A.M. had not yet been released in Britain (and would not be until 1968). Simon's other recordings then available in Britain consisted of three 45 rpm singles released on various labels, two of which were rock 'n' roll-inspired recordings with Garfunkel under the name Tom & Jerry. The other was representative of his experiments in folk but had been released in 1964 under the pseudonym Paul Kane. He was still under contract to Columbia, so he could record for their British label, CBS Records, and therefore decided to record a set of tracks for release to his folk audience. The Paul Simon Songbook was the result.

Recording and releases
Simon recorded the album at Levy's Recording Studio, 73 New Bond Street, London, over several dates in June 1965. Most of the songs required several takes. He only had one microphone for both his voice and his guitar.  Two songs ("The Sound of Silence" and "He Was My Brother") were re-recordings of songs originally found on Wednesday Morning, 3 A.M.. Of the remaining songs, all but two ("A Church is Burning" and "The Side Of A Hill") would be subsequently re-recorded in studio versions by Simon and Garfunkel. However, the lyrics to The Side of a Hill were later reworked as 'Canticle' and sung as counterpoint to Scarborough Fair on the duo's third album Parsley, Sage, Rosemary and Thyme. The lyrics to both The Side of a Hill and Canticle are notably absent from his 2008 volume 'Lyrics 1964-2008'.

The album was released along with the single "I Am a Rock"/"Leaves That Are Green", CBS 201797.

Artwork and notes
Simon's 1965 liner notes to the album comment of the songs that "there are some I would not write today", but that they "played a role in the transition" to his position as a musician at that time.

The album cover shows Simon and his then-girlfriend, Kathy Chitty, sitting on "narrow streets of cobblestone" in London, the city Simon had adopted as his home, and holding wooden figurines. In the 1970s, the album art was altered: the picture of Simon and Chitty was flipped horizontally, and the red script-like lettering eliminated in favor of an album title in white block print at the top.

Subsequent history
The album was released in the US by Columbia very briefly in 1969, but was recalled within a few days when Simon objected. It was re-released in 1981 on a Columbia LP in the "Collected Works" boxed set, and in 2004 by Columbia/Legacy on CD. The CD features two bonus tracks, alternative versions of "I Am a Rock" and "A Church is Burning" which were not part of the 1965 LP release. The mono version was released on CD.

The lyrics for the anti-war song "The Side of a Hill" were incorporated into the Simon & Garfunkel arrangement of "Scarborough Fair/Canticle" on Parsley, Sage, Rosemary and Thyme.

Later in 1965 and in early 1966, following the success in the US of "The Sound of Silence" as a single, Simon & Garfunkel re-recorded several of the songs featured on The Paul Simon Songbook and released them on their albums Sounds of Silence and Parsley, Sage, Rosemary and Thyme.

Track listing

* "Paul Kane" was a pseudonym used by Simon at this time, because of his fondness for the film Citizen Kane.

Other recordings
For earlier recordings of "The Sound of Silence" and "He Was My Brother": Wednesday Morning, 3 A.M..
For later recordings of "I Am a Rock", "Leaves That Are Green", "April Come She Will", "The Sound of Silence", "A Most Peculiar Man", and "Kathy's Song": Sounds of Silence.
For later recordings of "A Simple Desultory Philippic (or How I Was Robert McNamara'd into Submission)", "Flowers Never Bend With the Rainfall", and "Patterns": Parsley, Sage, Rosemary and Thyme.
For later recordings of "A Church is Burning": Live from New York City, 1967 and Old Friends (Extended CD edition), both live albums by Simon & Garfunkel.

References

Bibliography
Patrick Humphries, Paul Simon: Still Crazy After All These Years (New York: Doubleday, 1989). .

External links
 Paul Simon official website
 Simon & Garfunkel official website

1965 debut albums
CBS Records albums
Paul Simon albums